Hargis is a surname. Notable people with the surname include:

Billy James Hargis (1925–2004), American evangelist
Denver David Hargis (1921–1989), American politician
Gary Hargis (born 1956), American baseball player
John Hargis (swimmer) (born 1975), American swimmer
John Hargis (basketball) (1920–1986), American basketball player
V. Burns Hargis, American academic administrator

Places
Hargis, Kentucky, unincorporated community, United States
Hargis, Louisiana, unincorporated community, United States